The 1992 Arab Club Champions Cup was played in Qatar in the city of Doha. Al Shabab won the championship for the first time beating Al-Arabi in the final.

Participants

WA Tlemcen withdrew the tournament.

Preliminary round

Zone 1 (Gulf Area)
Al Shabab (Dubai) advanced to the final tournament.

Zone 2 (Red Sea)
Ismaily SC & Al Shabab (Riyadh) advanced to the final tournament.

Zone 3 (North Africa)
WA Tlemcen & Espérance de Tunis advanced to the final tournament.

Zone 4 (East Region)
Al-Faisaly & Hilal Al-Quds advanced to the final tournament.

Final tournament
Final tournament held in Doha, Qatar from 8 to 18 February 1992. WA Tlemcen withdrew the tournament, Espérance de Tunis moved from Group B to Group A.

Group stage

Group A

Group B

Knockout stage

Semi-finals

Final

Winners

References

External links
8th Arab Club Champions Cup 1992 - rsssf.com

UAFA Club Cup, 1992
UAFA Club Cup, 1992
1992